Molla Kuh (also Romanized as Mollā Kūh) is a village in Rud Pish Rural District, in the Central District of Fuman County, Gilan Province, Iran. At the 2006 census, its population was 41, in 9 families.

References 

Populated places in Fuman County